Thomas Newburn (10 August 1918 – 26 July 2003) was an Irish first-class cricketer.

Newburn was born at Belfast and played his early club cricket for the Central Presbyterian Association Cricket Club. He made one appearance in first-class cricket for Ireland against Scotland at Belfast in 1949. Batting twice during the match, Newburn was dismissed in Ireland's first-innings for 8 runs by George Youngson, while in their second-innings he was dismissed for 4 runs by William Edward. He took also took three wickets in the match, dismissing James Taylor, William Laidlaw and Robert McLaren in Scotland's second-innings. He later played his club cricket for Woodvale. He died at Belfast in July 2003.

References

External links

1918 births
2003 deaths
Cricketers from Belfast
Irish cricketers